The 1955–56 New York Rangers season was the franchise's 30th season. In the regular season, the Rangers finished third overall in the league with a 32–28–10 record. New York qualified for the Stanley Cup playoffs, where they lost to the Montreal Canadiens 4–1 in a best of seven games series.

Regular season

Final standings

Record vs. opponents

Schedule and results

|- align="center" bgcolor="#CCFFCC"
| 1 || 7 || @ Chicago Black Hawks || 7–4 || 1–0–0
|- align="center" bgcolor="#CCFFCC"
| 2 || 9 || @ Detroit Red Wings || 3–2 || 2–0–0
|- align="center" bgcolor="#FFBBBB"
| 3 || 15 || @ Montreal Canadiens || 4–1 || 2–1–0
|- align="center" bgcolor="#FFBBBB"
| 4 || 16 || @ Boston Bruins || 4–1 || 2–2–0
|- align="center" bgcolor="#CCFFCC"
| 5 || 19 || Toronto Maple Leafs || 6–2 || 3–2–0
|- align="center" bgcolor="#FFBBBB"
| 6 || 22 || @ Toronto Maple Leafs || 3–2 || 3–3–0
|- align="center" bgcolor="#CCFFCC"
| 7 || 23 || Chicago Black Hawks || 5–4 || 4–3–0
|- align="center" bgcolor="#CCFFCC"
| 8 || 26 || Detroit Red Wings || 6–2 || 5–3–0
|- align="center" bgcolor="#FFBBBB"
| 9 || 29 || Boston Bruins || 1–0 || 5–4–0
|-

|- align="center" bgcolor="white"
| 10 || 3 || @ Detroit Red Wings || 1–1 || 5–4–1
|- align="center" bgcolor="#CCFFCC"
| 11 || 5 || @ Toronto Maple Leafs || 3–0 || 6–4–1
|- align="center" bgcolor="#CCFFCC"
| 12 || 6 || @ Chicago Black Hawks || 4–2 || 7–4–1
|- align="center" bgcolor="white"
| 13 || 9 || Montreal Canadiens || 1–1 || 7–4–2
|- align="center" bgcolor="#FFBBBB"
| 14 || 10 || @ Boston Bruins || 5–1 || 7–5–2
|- align="center" bgcolor="#CCFFCC"
| 15 || 13 || Toronto Maple Leafs || 4–1 || 8–5–2
|- align="center" bgcolor="white"
| 16 || 16 || Detroit Red Wings || 3–3 || 8–5–3
|- align="center" bgcolor="#FFBBBB"
| 17 || 19 || @ Montreal Canadiens || 6–1 || 8–6–3
|- align="center" bgcolor="white"
| 18 || 20 || Montreal Canadiens || 1–1 || 8–6–4
|- align="center" bgcolor="#CCFFCC"
| 19 || 23 || Boston Bruins || 4–0 || 9–6–4
|- align="center" bgcolor="#CCFFCC"
| 20 || 24 || @ Boston Bruins || 5–0 || 10–6–4
|- align="center" bgcolor="white"
| 21 || 27 || Montreal Canadiens || 3–3 || 10–6–5
|- align="center" bgcolor="#CCFFCC"
| 22 || 30 || Chicago Black Hawks || 6–1 || 11–6–5
|-

|- align="center" bgcolor="#CCFFCC"
| 23 || 2 || @ Chicago Black Hawks || 2–1 || 12–6–5
|- align="center" bgcolor="#CCFFCC"
| 24 || 4 || Detroit Red Wings || 7–3 || 13–6–5
|- align="center" bgcolor="#CCFFCC"
| 25 || 7 || Toronto Maple Leafs || 3–1 || 14–6–5
|- align="center" bgcolor="#FFBBBB"
| 26 || 10 || @ Toronto Maple Leafs || 6–1 || 14–7–5
|- align="center" bgcolor="#FFBBBB"
| 27 || 11 || @ Detroit Red Wings || 2–0 || 14–8–5
|- align="center" bgcolor="#FFBBBB"
| 28 || 14 || Chicago Black Hawks || 4–1 || 14–9–5
|- align="center" bgcolor="#FFBBBB"
| 29 || 15 || @ Montreal Canadiens || 2–0 || 14–10–5
|- align="center" bgcolor="#CCFFCC"
| 30 || 18 || Toronto Maple Leafs || 4–1 || 15–10–5
|- align="center" bgcolor="white"
| 31 || 21 || Boston Bruins || 3–3 || 15–10–6
|- align="center" bgcolor="#CCFFCC"
| 32 || 25 || Montreal Canadiens || 5–1 || 16–10–6
|- align="center" bgcolor="#FFBBBB"
| 33 || 29 || Chicago Black Hawks || 4–2 || 16–11–6
|- align="center" bgcolor="#CCFFCC"
| 34 || 31 || Boston Bruins || 6–2 || 17–11–6
|-

|- align="center" bgcolor="#CCFFCC"
| 35 || 1 || @ Boston Bruins || 4–2 || 18–11–6
|- align="center" bgcolor="#CCFFCC"
| 36 || 4 || Detroit Red Wings || 5–4 || 19–11–6
|- align="center" bgcolor="#FFBBBB"
| 37 || 8 || Chicago Black Hawks || 5–3 || 19–12–6
|- align="center" bgcolor="#CCFFCC"
| 38 || 11 || Montreal Canadiens || 6–1 || 20–12–6
|- align="center" bgcolor="#FFBBBB"
| 39 || 12 || @ Detroit Red Wings || 6–0 || 20–13–6
|- align="center" bgcolor="#CCFFCC"
| 40 || 14 || @ Toronto Maple Leafs || 6–5 || 21–13–6
|- align="center" bgcolor="#CCFFCC"
| 41 || 15 || @ Chicago Black Hawks || 2–0 || 22–13–6
|- align="center" bgcolor="white"
| 42 || 17 || @ Chicago Black Hawks || 2–2 || 22–13–7
|- align="center" bgcolor="#FFBBBB"
| 43 || 21 || @ Montreal Canadiens || 3–1 || 22–14–7
|- align="center" bgcolor="#FFBBBB"
| 44 || 22 || @ Boston Bruins || 3–1 || 22–15–7
|- align="center" bgcolor="#FFBBBB"
| 45 || 26 || @ Detroit Red Wings || 3–2 || 22–16–7
|- align="center" bgcolor="#CCFFCC"
| 46 || 28 || @ Toronto Maple Leafs || 3–1 || 23–16–7
|- align="center" bgcolor="#CCFFCC"
| 47 || 29 || @ Chicago Black Hawks || 6–2 || 24–16–7
|-

|- align="center" bgcolor="#CCFFCC"
| 48 || 1 || Toronto Maple Leafs || 5–2 || 25–16–7
|- align="center" bgcolor="#FFBBBB"
| 49 || 4 || @ Boston Bruins || 7–1 || 25–17–7
|- align="center" bgcolor="white"
| 50 || 5 || Montreal Canadiens || 3–3 || 25–17–8
|- align="center" bgcolor="white"
| 51 || 8 || Boston Bruins || 3–3 || 25–17–9
|- align="center" bgcolor="#FFBBBB"
| 52 || 11 || @ Toronto Maple Leafs || 5–0 || 25–18–9
|- align="center" bgcolor="#CCFFCC"
| 53 || 12 || Detroit Red Wings || 2–1 || 26–18–9
|- align="center" bgcolor="#FFBBBB"
| 54 || 14 || @ Detroit Red Wings || 5–3 || 26–19–9
|- align="center" bgcolor="#CCFFCC"
| 55 || 15 || Chicago Black Hawks || 6–1 || 27–19–9
|- align="center" bgcolor="#FFBBBB"
| 56 || 18 || @ Montreal Canadiens || 9–4 || 27–20–9
|- align="center" bgcolor="#FFBBBB"
| 57 || 19 || Boston Bruins || 3–0 || 27–21–9
|- align="center" bgcolor="#FFBBBB"
| 58 || 22 || Toronto Maple Leafs || 4–2 || 27–22–9
|- align="center" bgcolor="#FFBBBB"
| 59 || 23 || @ Montreal Canadiens || 5–2 || 27–23–9
|- align="center" bgcolor="#CCFFCC"
| 60 || 26 || Detroit Red Wings || 3–2 || 28–23–9
|- align="center" bgcolor="#FFBBBB"
| 61 || 28 || @ Detroit Red Wings || 4–1 || 28–24–9
|- align="center" bgcolor="#CCFFCC"
| 62 || 29 || Boston Bruins || 4–2 || 29–24–9
|-

|- align="center" bgcolor="#FFBBBB"
| 63 || 3 || @ Boston Bruins || 5–2 || 29–25–9
|- align="center" bgcolor="#CCFFCC"
| 64 || 4 || Chicago Black Hawks || 3–2 || 30–25–9
|- align="center" bgcolor="#CCFFCC"
| 65 || 8 || @ Chicago Black Hawks || 6–4 || 31–25–9
|- align="center" bgcolor="#FFBBBB"
| 66 || 10 || @ Toronto Maple Leafs || 5–2 || 31–26–9
|- align="center" bgcolor="#CCFFCC"
| 67 || 11 || Toronto Maple Leafs || 4–2 || 32–26–9
|- align="center" bgcolor="white"
| 68 || 15 || Detroit Red Wings || 2–2 || 32–26–10
|- align="center" bgcolor="#FFBBBB"
| 69 || 17 || @ Montreal Canadiens || 7–2 || 32–27–10
|- align="center" bgcolor="#FFBBBB"
| 70 || 18 || Montreal Canadiens || 3–1 || 32–28–10
|-

Playoffs

Key:  Win  Loss

Player statistics
Skaters

Goaltenders

†Denotes player spent time with another team before joining Rangers. Stats reflect time with Rangers only.
‡Traded mid-season. Stats reflect time with Rangers only.

Awards and records

Transactions

See also
1955–56 NHL season

References

External links
 

New York Rangers seasons
New York Rangers
New York Rangers
New York Rangers
New York Rangers
Madison Square Garden
1950s in Manhattan